William II the Great (c. 930/93524 December 1003) was Count of Weimar from 963 and Duke of Thuringia from 1002.

He was the eldest son of Count William I of Weimar.

Family 
By an unknown wife, he had children:
 William III (died 16 April 1039)
 Poppo (died 13 July before 1044)
 Agnes, who likely married Frederick I, Count Palatine of Saxony (de)

930s births
1003 deaths
Year of birth uncertain
House of Weimar